The Roman Bridge is a cultural heritage monument in Rogovë, Gjakova, Kosovo.

Near a place known as Sacaranica on a bend of the White Drin River, traces of an old bridge remain. Soft clay soils here have kept the meander in its place. The three extant pieces of the bridge include two on the right bank and a foundation on the left bank. The foundation is made from large and medium stones bonded with lime mortar, while the walls are built from alternating stone strips and slabs similar to the brick-based opus mixtum found at other Roman ruins. Fine-gravel mortar is used in the slab joints, while coarse river gravel binds the stone belt joints.

River erosion resistance indicates a fairly strong mortar. Over time, rotting beams and trees pierced holes on one side of the wall.

References

Historic sites in Kosovo